Bagh-e Salem may refer to:
 Bagh-e Salem-e Jonubi
 Bagh-e Salem-e Shomali